Díaz is a common surname of Spanish origin with multiple meanings in multiple languages. First found in Kingdom of Castile, where the name originated in the Visigoth period, the name accounts for about 0.17% of the Spanish population, ranking as the 14th-most frequently found surname in both 1999 and 2004 compared to the most popular Spanish surname of those years.

Variants and related names
There is minor evidence that Díez may be equivalent to Díaz, in the form of Spanish language listing of most frequent surnames in 1999 Spain. However, a 2008 in-press academic manuscript about Spanish naming in 2004 suggests otherwise, listing statistics for "Díaz" and "Díez" separately. The surname is cognate with the Portuguese language surname Dias.

Usage
Díaz and the anglicized form Diaz appear to be surnames only, without evidence for use as given names.  Use of Diaz may arise through Anglicization of Portuguese language Dias.

Many examples of the surnames Díaz exist among historically notable people as a patronymic of Diego.  Among the earliest such examples is El Cid, whose real name was Rodrigo Díaz de Vivar, and whose father's given name was Diego.

There is at least one instance of use as a single name, the former Norwegian rap artist Diaz, who was born to a Spanish father and Norwegian mother; his birth name is "Andrés Rafael Díaz".

Geographical distribution
As of 2014, 21.5% of all known bearers of the surname Díaz were residents of Mexico (frequency 1:132), 11.4% of Colombia (1:96), 9.1% of Argentina (1:108), 8.0% of Spain (1:134), 7.2% of Venezuela (1:96), 6.7% of the United States (1:1,242), 5.2% of Peru (1:142), 5.0% of Cuba (1:53), 4.6% of Chile (1:87), 3.1% of the Philippines (1:742), 2.9% of the Dominican Republic (1:83), 2.5% of Puerto Rico (1:33), 2.4% of Guatemala (1:155), 2.0% of Honduras (1:100), 1.4% of El Salvador (1:107), 1.3% of Nicaragua (1:103), 1.2% of Ecuador (1:293) and 1.0% of Paraguay (1:161).

In Spain, the frequency of the surname was higher than national average (1:134) in the following autonomous communities:
 1. Canary Islands (1:53)
 2. Asturias (1:54)
 3. Extremadura (1:85)
 4. Cantabria (1:89)
 5. Castilla-La Mancha (1:97)
 6. Galicia (1:112)
 7. Andalusia (1:114)
 8. Community of Madrid (1:121)

In Puerto Rico, the frequency of the surname was higher than national average (1:33) in the following municipalities:

 1. Manatí (1:14)
 2. Peñuelas (1:16)
 3. Arecibo (1:16)
 4. Morovis (1:16)
 5. Yauco (1:17)
 6. Barceloneta (1:17)
 7. Guayanilla (1:17)
 8. Florida (1:17)
 9. Ponce (1:19)
 10. Hatillo (1:19)
 11. Isabela (1:19)
 12. Utuado (1:20)
 13. Cabo Rojo (1:20)
 14. Ciales (1:21)
 15. Lares (1:21)
 16. Naranjito (1:21)
 17. Camuy (1:22)
 18. Quebradillas (1:22)
 19. Rincón (1:22)
 20. Canóvanas (1:22)
 21. Aguadilla (1:23)
 22. San Juan (1:23)
 23. Loíza (1:24)
 24. Juana Díaz (1:25)
 25. Río Grande (1:25)
 26. Trujillo Alto (1:28)

In Latin America Díaz was among the top 25% of surnames in use based on a study conducted in 1987 by the Institute for Genealogy and History for Latin America (De Platt 1996, pages 31–32).

Spanish surnames, including Díaz, are found more abundantly in Southern Italy than other non-Italian surnames as a result of the domination of Italy by Spain during the 17th century (Fucilla 1949).

The following matrix contains available information on the frequency of this surname in various countries across a span of years.

Reference codes, see #References: (a)=OcioTotal 1999, (b)=Mateos & Tucker 2008, (c)=Longley, et al., (d)=United States Census Bureau 1995, (e)=United States Census Bureau 2000

Several assessed countries have shown no instances of this surname, among these being Northern Ireland, Republic of Ireland and Scotland (Bowie 2003; Longley, et al.).

People

Arts and entertainment
 Alirio Díaz (1923–2016), Venezuelan guitarist
 Álvaro Díaz González (born 1972), Chilean screenwriter, producer and director
 Andres Rafael Diaz Rosa (born 1976), Spanish/Norwegian rapper "Diaz"
 Alyssa Diaz (born 1985), American-Colombian actress
 Cameron Diaz (born 1972), American actress, producer, and former fashion model
 César Díaz (guitarist) (1951–2002), Puerto Rican guitar amplifier technician and guitarist
 Dilia Díaz Cisneros (1925–2017), Venezuelan teacher and poet 
 Diomedes Díaz (1957–2013), Colombian singer, singer, songwriter and composer
 Elisa Ruiz Díaz
 Francine Diaz (born 2004), Filipina actress and model
 Gloria Diaz (born 1951) Filipina actress, TV host and beauty queen, first Filipina to win Miss Universe
Hernan Diaz (born 1973), writer and academic
 Joey Diaz (born 1963), Cuban-American stand up comedian, actor, podcast host
 Joko Diaz, Filipino actor and action star.
 Jonny Diaz (born 1984), American contemporary Christian musician
 Johnny Diaz, American novelist and a journalist
 José Manuel Díaz (1936–2013), Venezuelan actor and comedian in television and film known by the mononym Joselo 
 Julio Díaz (disambiguation), several people
 Junot Díaz (1986), American writer
 Lav Diaz or Lavrente Indico Diaz (born 1958), Filipino independent filmmaker
 Leandro Díaz (composer) (1928–2013), Colombian composer
 Mariano Díaz (born 1929), Venezuelan photographer
 Paquito Diaz (1937–2011), Filipino actor and director; father of Joko Diaz.
 Priscilla Diaz (MISSPSTAR/P-Star) (born 1994), American rapper, singer and actress 
 Narcisse Virgilio Díaz de la Peña (1807–1876), French painter of the Barbizon school
 Rafael Díaz Ycaza (1925–2013), Ecuadorian poet and writer
  (1903–1968), Venezuelan writer
 Robert Alan Diaz (1975-2015), American rapper better known as "Pumpkinhead"
 Rocsi Diaz (born 1983), Honduran-born, American television personality and model
 Romy Diaz  (1941–2005), Filipino actor
 Roxana Díaz (born 1972), Venezuelan television actress
 Simón Díaz (1928–2014), Venezuelan singer and composer
 Sixto Diaz Rodriguez (born 1942), Mexican-American singer-songwriter
 Ulpiano Díaz (1900–1990), Cuban percussionist
 Zadi Diaz, American podcaster and video blogger

Politics and military
 Adam Perez Diaz (1909-2010), the first Hispanic elected to the Phoenix City Council and also the first Hispanic to serve as Phoenix's Vice-Mayor
 Armando Diaz (1861–1928), Italian General and a Marshal of Italy during World War I
 Edwige Diaz (1987-), French politician
 Héctor A. Díaz, American politician
 José E. Díaz (1833–1867), Paraguayan general, hero of the Paraguayan War 
 Porfirio Díaz (1830–1915), Mexican soldier, politician, dictator who served seven terms as President of Mexico, President of Mexico following the French intervention in Mexico
 Ramón Díaz (1926-2017), Uruguayan lawyer, economist and journalist, Chairman of the Central Bank
 Rodrigo Díaz de Vivar (c. 1043 – 1099), better known as El Cid, or Rodrigo, Castilian nobleman and military leader in medieval Spain
 Domingo Díaz Arosemena (1875-1949) Panamanian politician and president from 1948-1949

Sports
 Aledmys Díaz (born 1990), Cuban professional baseball player
 Alexis Díaz (baseball) (born 1996), Puerto Rican baseball player
 Ana Díaz (born 1954), Cuban volleyball player
 Antonio Díaz Jurado (1969–2013), Spanish footballer
 Brahim Díaz (born 1999), Spanish footballer
 Diomar Díaz (born 1990), Venezuelan footballer
 Edwin Díaz (born 1994), Puerto Rican baseball player
 Elías Díaz (born 1990), Venezuelan baseball player
 Hernan Diaz, Argetine footballer
 Hidilyn Diaz (born 1991), Filipino weightlifter and Olympic Champion
 Hugo Díaz, multiple people
 Jhonathan Díaz (born 1996), Venezuelan baseball player
 Joaquin Carlos Diaz (1948–2015), Cuban chess master
 Jordan Díaz (baseball) (born 2000), Colombian baseball player
 Joselo Díaz (born 1980), Major League Baseball pitcher
 Juan Díaz Sánchez (1948–2013), Spanish footballer known as Juanito
 Lewin Díaz (born 1996), Dominican baseball player
 Linus Diaz (born 1933), Sri Lankan long-distance runner
 Luis Díaz (Colombian footballer) (born 1997), Colombian professional footballer
 Matt Diaz (born 1978), American professional baseball player and sportscaster
 Miguel Díaz (baseball) (born 1994), Dominican baseball player
 Nate Diaz (born 1985), American mixed martial arts (MMA) fighter
 Nick Diaz  (born 1983), American mixed martial arts (MMA) fighter
 Patricia Díaz Perea (born 1984), Spanish professional triathlete
 Raquel Diaz (born 1990), ring name of American professional wrestler Shaul Guerrero. Also singer, model
 Salvador Diaz (born 1933), Venezuelan chess master
 Tony Diaz (born 1977), Dominican baseball coach
 Víctor Díaz (basketball) (born 1968), Venezuelan basketball player
 Yainer Díaz (born 1998), Dominican baseball player
 Yandy Díaz (born 1991), Cuban professional baseball player
 Yennsy Díaz (born 1996), Dominican Republic professional baseball player
 Yusniel Díaz (born 1996), Cuban baseball player

Fictional characters 
Ernesto Diaz, the main antagonist of Time Crisis II
 Markio Diaz, italian artist 1972
 Marco Diaz, a character in the animated series Star vs. the Forces of Evil
 Marco Diaz, a character in the television series Bloodline

Others 
 Antonio Díaz (disambiguation), several people
 Bartolomeu Dias (c. 1451–1500), first European known to have sailed around the Southern tip of Africa
 Bernal Díaz del Castillo (1492 to 1496, precise birth date is uncertain – 1584), Spanish conquistador
 Federico Díaz Legórburu
 Franklin Chang-Díaz (born 1950) a former NASA astronaut from Costa Rica.
 Matthew Diaz, American military lawyer
 Miguel H. Díaz, American diplomat
 Virgilio Morales Díaz, was one of the last National Chief Scouts of Cuban Scouting

See also
 Dias, the Portuguese cognate of Díaz
 Spanish naming customs

References

 
 
 Catholic Encyclopedia (1913). s:Catholic Encyclopedia (1913)/El Cid. Retrieved on 2008-05-02.
 
 
 
 
 
  
 United States Census Bureau (9 May 1995). s:1990 Census Name Files dist.all.last (1-100). Retrieved on 2008-04-04.

External links
 A history of the Díaz surname compiled by the Institute for Genealogy and History for Latin America is available for a fee.  See pages 38 and 39 of https://books.google.com/books?id=xxcSboo5KTAC for more information.

Spanish-language surnames
Surnames of Spanish origin
Patronymic surnames
Surnames from given names
Surnames of Colombian origin
Surnames of Puerto Rican origin